was a feudal domain under the Tokugawa shogunate of Edo period Japan.  It is located in Shinano Province, Honshū. The domain was centered at Matsushiro Castle, located in what is now part of the city of Nagano in Nagano Prefecture.

History
Kawanakajima in northern Shinano Province was the site of numerous battles in the Sengoku period between Takeda Shingen and Uesugi Kenshin. After the start of the Tokugawa shogunate, this area was awarded as a domain to Mori Tadamasa for his efforts in the Battle of Sekigahara by Tokugawa Ieyasu. The marked the start of the 137,000 koku Kawanakajima Domain. Mori was transferred three years later to Tsuyama Domain in Mimasaka Province in 1603. The domain was then awarded in 1610 to Matsudaira Tadateru, the 6th son of Tokugawa Ieyasu; however, he was dispossessed in 1606 and the domain was suppressed.

In 1616, Matsudaira Tadamasa, the son of Yūki Hideyasu was awarded a 130,000 koku holding in northern Shinano, and chose Matsushiro as the location for his castle. The marked the start of Matsushiro Domain. He was transferred to Takada Domain in Echigo Province after only three years, and the domain went to Sakai Tadakatsu, who was in turn transferred to Shonai Domain in Dewa Province in 1622.

The Sanada clan had ruled the neighbouring  Chiisagata District in Shinano Province during the Sengoku period under the Takeda clan and subsequently most of northern Shinano and Kōzuke Province as retainers of Toyotomi Hideyoshi.  Following the establishment of the Tokugawa shogunate, Sanada Nobuyuki was confirmed as  daimyō with Ueda Domain, with holdings assessed at 95,000 koku. However, in 1622 he was transferred to Matsushiro Domain, with an increase in kokudaka to 120,000 koku. The Sanada clan remained in at Matsushiro until the Meiji restoration.

The domain was later reduced to 100,000 koku when Numata Domain in Kōzuke Province was split off as a separate domain. The Sanada enjoyed close ties with the Tokugawa clan, as Sanada  Nobuyuki married an adopted daughter of Tokugawa Ieyasu. Although classed as tozama daimyō, the Sanada were accorded the same status and privileges as fudai daimyō in their audiences with the Shōgun, and received significant financial assistance when Matsushiro Castle was destroyed by a fire in 1717, and when the castle town was ravaged by a flood in 1742. A han school was founded in 1758, and the 8th daimyō, Sanada Yukitsura, served as a rōjū. However, towards the Bakumatsu period, the domain suffered from financial difficulties. The Zenkoji earthquake of 1847 destroyed most of the town, and the domain's finances were depleted by demands from the shogunate for guard duty in Edo Bay against the return of Perry's "blackships". The Bakumatsu period reformer Sakuma Shōzan was a samurai from Matsushiro domain, and many of the domain's samurai supported his efforts toward modernization of the domain's military.

During the Boshin War, the domain was one of the first in Shinano to side with the imperial cause, and sent forces to fight in the Battle of Hokuetsu and Battle of Aizu. In July 1871, with the abolition of the han system, Matsushiro Domain briefly became Matsushiro Prefecture, and was merged into the newly created Nagano Prefecture. Under the new Meiji government, Sanada Yukimoto, the last daimyo of Matsushiro Domain was given the kazoku peerage title of shishaku (viscount), and was later elevated to hakushaku (count).

Bakumatsu period holdings
As with most domains in the han system, Matsushiro Domain consisted of several discontinuous territories calculated to provide the assigned kokudaka, based on periodic cadastral surveys and projected agricultural yields.
Shinano Province
102 villages in Minochi District
26 villages in Hanishina District
117 villages in Sarashina District

List of daimyō

As Kawanakajima Domain

As Matsushiro Domain

See also
List of Han

References
The content of this article was largely derived from that of the corresponding article on Japanese Wikipedia.

External links
 "Matsushiro" Domain on "Edo 300 HTML"

Notes

Domains of Japan
History of Nagano Prefecture
Shinano Province
Fukui-Matsudaira clan
Nagasawa-Matsudaira clan
Sakai clan
Sanada clan